Roy Snell (25 March 1901 – 3 April 1977) was an Australian rules footballer who played with Fitzroy in the Victorian Football League (VFL).

Notes

External links 
		

1901 births
1977 deaths
Australian rules footballers from South Australia
Fitzroy Football Club players
West Adelaide Football Club players